Ekkasak Buabao (born May 11, 1985), simply known as Ekk, is a Thai professional footballer who plays as a defender for Thai League 3 club Ayutthaya United.

Club career

External links
 Profile at Goal

1985 births
Living people
Ekkasak Buabao
Ekkasak Buabao
Association football defenders
Ekkasak Buabao
Ekkasak Buabao
Ekkasak Buabao
Ekkasak Buabao
Ekkasak Buabao